Harrison Peak is a peak  high along the north side of Wood Glacier, about  north of Mount McDonald, in the Victory Mountains of Victoria Land, Antarctica. It was mapped by the United States Geological Survey from surveys and U.S. Navy air photos, 1960–64, and was named by the Advisory Committee on Antarctic Names for William R. Harrison, a biologist at McMurdo Station, 1967–68.

References

Mountains of Victoria Land
Borchgrevink Coast